The Indianapolis Grand Prix is a motorcycling event held on the combined road course at the Indianapolis Motor Speedway in Speedway, Indiana. From 2008 to 2015, it was held as part of the Grand Prix motorcycle racing season (MotoGP). The event was revived in 2020 with MotoAmerica.

The addition of a motorcycle race at the Indianapolis Motor Speedway loosely coincided with the track's Centennial Era, which celebrated the 100th anniversary of the opening of the track (1909) and the 100th anniversary of the first 500 (1911). The motorcycle race represented a "throwback" to the early days of the Speedway, as motorcycle races were in fact the first competitive racing events held on the track in August 1909.

Track layout

The circuit used is a modified version of the combined road course used for the Formula One United States Grand Prix from 2000 to 2007. The circuit was reversed to a counterclockwise orientation, and a new complex of corners was added inside the infield of oval turn one. The new "Snake Pit" section, as it became known, was nicknamed for its location where notorious revelry once took place during the 1970s. The new series of corners precluded the bikes from using any of the banked oval corners. The double-hairpin near the museum and before the Hulman Straight was replaced with more traditional esses. Furthermore, the motorcycles stay low in the south short chute (approaching the Snake Pit section) between oval turn 1 and 2, using the pavement of the warm-up lane rather than the oval track's short chute.

The circuit was re-profiled in 2014, with three new motorcycle-only sections: one in the Snake Pit (which has become a prime overtaking spot), a more open entrance to Hulman Straight, and the final esses leading to the pit straight was changed to be more open and flowing.

History

The inaugural Red Bull Indianapolis GP took place 99 years after the previous motorcycle race at the track, in 1909.

The first motorsports event at the track consisted of 7 motorcycle races, sanctioned by the Federation of American Motorcyclists (FAM), on August 14, 1909. This was originally planned as a two-day, 15-race program, but ended before the first day was completed, due to concerns over suitability of the track surface for motorcycle use. The Rider with most victories at this grand prix is Marc Márquez with three victories in MotoGP class and two victories in the Moto2, followed by 
Nicolas Terol with three victories in the 125cc two-stroke class, followed by Dani Pedrosa and Álex Rins with two victories each and all the others have only one victory.  This grand prix has been won only by Spanish, Italian, Australian, Finnish and Belgian riders.

Motorcycles on Meridian rally
The race became part of a major motorcycle event organized by Indianapolis Motor Speedway, the Motorcycles on Meridian motorcycle rally, held on Meridian Street near Monument Circle in downtown Indianapolis, attracting approximately 10,000 cyclists each night.  Various dirt tracks held flat-track motorcycle races during the weekend which became analogous to midget car racing's "Night Before the 500" held during the Indianapolis 500, often drawing star MotoGP riders in attendance.  The event continues to be held, but with the 2020 Indianapolis 500 being moved to the August event of the Motorcycles on Meridian date, both the Motorcycles on Meridian and the MotoAmerica round will be changed.

MotoGP winners

Multiple winners (riders)

Multiple winners (manufacturers)

Notes

MotoAmerica winners
2020
Superbike: Cameron Beaubier
Stock 1000: Cameron Petersen
Supersport: Richie Escalante
Twins Cup: Rocco Landers
Liqui Moly Junior Cup: Rocco Landers

References

External links
 Official site

 
Recurring sporting events established in 2008
Recurring sporting events disestablished in 2015
2008 establishments in Indiana
2015 disestablishments in Indiana